The brown hornbill has been split into two species:

 Austen's brown hornbill, Anorrhinus austeni
 Tickell's brown hornbill or rusty-cheeked) hornbill, Anorrhinus tickelli